Daniel Gottesman is a physicist, known for his work regarding quantum error correction, in particular the invention of the stabilizer formalism for quantum error-correcting codes, and the Gottesman–Knill theorem. He is a faculty member at the University of Maryland.

Gottesman completed a B.A. in Physics at Harvard University (1992) and a Ph.D. in Physics at Caltech (1997). He is a Fellow of the American Physical Society (2013). In 2003, he was named to the MIT Technology Review TR100 as one of the top 100 innovators in the world under the age of 35.

See also
Clifford gates
Continuous-variable quantum information

References

External links
Gottesman's homepage at the Perimeter Institute for Theoretical Physics in Waterloo, Ontario

1970 births
Living people
21st-century American physicists
Quantum information scientists
Harvard College alumni
California Institute of Technology alumni
University of Maryland, College Park faculty
Fellows of the American Physical Society